The 1938 Football Championship of UkrSSR were part of the 1938 Soviet republican football competitions in the Soviet Ukraine.

Persha Hrupa
Promoted: 
 (Druha Hrupa) Dzerzhynets Voroshylovhrad, Stal Dniprodzerzhynsk, Stal Kryvyi Rih
 (debut) Kharchovyk Odesa, Dynamo-2 Kyiv, Lokomotyv Kharkiv
Relegated: Stal Kostiantynivka
Replaced: Sudnobudivnyk Mykolaiv → Dynamo Mykolaiv

Druha Hrupa
Promoted: Stal Voroshylovsk (Tretia Hrupa), Kharchovyk Tyraspol (Tretia Hrupa), Avanhard Druzhkivka (Hrupa Pyat A)

Stakhanovets Sergo withdrew before the start

Tretia Hrupa
All lower groups were restructured and groups below the 3rd were consolidated into Tretia Hrupa.
Promoted: 
 (whole Chetverta Hrupa except Shostka) Stal Makiivka, Berdychiv, Ordzhonikidze, Konotop, Sumy, Kremenchuk, Chystiakove
 (whole Hrupa Pyat A except Mariupol) Voznesensk, Berdyansk, Starobilsk, Krasnyi Luch, Kirovo, Sloviansk
 (whole Hrupa Pyat B except Rubizhne) Stakhanovets Krasnoarmiysk, Novohrad-Volynskyi, Korosten, Synelnykove, Uman, Koziatyn, Melitopol
 (returning) Artemivsk
 (debut) Smila, z-d im. Lenina Verkhniy, Stakhanovets Lysychansk, Lokomotyv Lozova

Zone 1 (East)
Subgroup A

Subgroup B 

 Berdyansk excluded

Zone 1 final
 Krasnyi Luch — Melitopol 3:0

Zone 2 (West)
Subgroup A

Subgroup B

 Koziatyn excluded
Zone 2 final
 Mohyliv-Podilskyi — Berdychiv 1:0

Zone 3 (Centre)
Subgroup A

 Kremenchuk was excluded for no show to matches with Kherson and Voznesensk.

Subgroup B

Zone 3 final
 Poltava — Znannia Kherson 3:2

Zone 4 (East) 
Subgroup A

Subgroup B

 Zone 4 final
 z-d im. Lenina Verkhniy  — Lokomotyv Lozova ?:?

Ukrainian clubs at the All-Union level
 Group A (6): Dynamo Kyiv, Dynamo Odesa, Stakhanovets Stalino, Silmash Kharkiv, Lokomotyv Kyiv, Spartak Kharkiv

Withdrawn
 (all-Union level) Stal (z-d im. Lenina) Dnipropetrovsk, Dynamo Dnipropetrovsk, Stal (z-d im. Petrovskoho) Dnipropetrovsk, Lokomotyv Dnipropetrovsk, Traktor Kharkiv, Dynamo Kharkiv, Spartak Kyiv

See also
 1938 Cup of the Ukrainian SSR

References

External links
 1938. Football Championship of the UkrSSR (1938. Первенство УССР.) Luhansk Nash Futbol.
 1938 (1938 год). History of Soviet championships among KFK.

Ukraine
Football Championship of the Ukrainian SSR
Championship